Kenneth Rouse (August 22, 1906 – August 6, 1958) was an American football player.  He played center for Amos Alonzo Stagg's University of Chicago football team from 1925 to 1927.  He was captain of the 1927 team and won the 1927 Chicago Tribune Silver Football trophy as the most valuable player in the Big Ten Conference.

References

1906 births
1958 deaths
American football centers
Chicago Maroons football players
University of Chicago alumni